Mr. Sloane is a British comedy television series that was first broadcast on Sky Atlantic on 23 May 2014. The six-part series was written by Robert B. Weide, Aschlin Ditta and Oliver Lansley and directed by Robert B. Weide. It is set in Watford in 1969.

Overview
In 1969 in Watford, Hertfordshire, Jeremy Sloane, a depressed accountant, has lost his job and his wife, Janet. Sloane gets a part-time job, and at a hardware shop he meets a young, free-spirited American manic pixie dream girl named Robin who may just help him get his life back on track.

Cast
Nick Frost as Jeremy Sloane
Olivia Colman as Janet
Ophelia Lovibond as Robin
Peter Serafinowicz as Ross
Lawry Lewin as Beans
Michael Malarkey as Craig
Brendan Patricks as Reggie

Production
Filming began in April 2013. The series is a Big Talk Productions and Whyaduck Productions production with BBC Worldwide as the distributor.

In October 2014, Sky announced the show would not be returning for a second series.

International broadcast
The series premiered in Australia on 15 June 2015 on BBC First.

References

External links
 
 

British comedy television shows
2014 British television series debuts
2014 British television series endings
2010s British comedy television series
English-language television shows
Sky Atlantic original programming
Television shows set in London
Television series set in 1969